The Parliamentary Elections Act 1770 (also known as the Grenville Act) is an Act of the Parliament of Great Britain (10 Geo III c. 16). The Act transferred the power of trying election petitions from the House of Commons as a whole to a less politicised committee of the House. All contested elections were to be considered by a committee of thirteen members selected by ballot. The Act was initially limited to one year, but was extended several times. A bill was passed in 1774 to make it perpetual – by that time five cases had already been tried.

This Act was repealed by section 1 of the Controverted Elections Act 1828 (9 Geo. IV c. 22).

References
Erskine May, Chapter VI, pp. 362–75, Election Petitions: Places and Pensions

Election law in the United Kingdom
Repealed Great Britain Acts of Parliament
Election legislation
Great Britain Acts of Parliament 1770
Elections in the Kingdom of Great Britain